Glebe is a small village in County Tyrone, Northern Ireland. In the 2001 Census it had a population of 672 people. It is in the Strabane District Council area and lies west of Sion Mills on the B165 road and the road between Strabane and Erganagh.

The eastern part of the village is in the townland of Glebe, the western part in the townland of Glebe (Old) in the historic civil parish of Urney.

See also 

List of villages in Northern Ireland
List of towns in Northern Ireland

Villages in County Tyrone